The 2020 1. divisjon (referred to as OBOS-ligaen for sponsorship reasons) was a Norwegian second-tier football league season.

Teams
In the 2019 1. divisjon, Aalesund, Sandefjord and Start were promoted to the 2020 Eliteserien, while Notodden, Skeid and Tromsdalen were relegated to the 2020 2. divisjon.

Lillestrøm, Tromsø and Ranheim were relegated from the 2019 Eliteserien, while Stjørdals-Blink, Grorud and Åsane were promoted from the 2019 2. divisjon.

Stadia and personnel

1 Ahead of the season, Nest-Sotra changed its name to Øygarden.

Managerial changes

League table

Positions by round

Results

Play-offs

Promotion play-offs

The 3rd to 6th placed teams took part in the promotion play-offs; these were single leg knockout matches. In the first round, the 5th placed team played at home against the 6th placed team. The winner of the first round then met the 4th placed team on away ground in the second round. The winner of the second round then met the 3rd placed team on away ground. The winner of the third round advanced to play the 14th placed team in Eliteserien on neutral ground in the Eliteserien play-offs for a spot in the top-flight next season.

Relegation play-offs

The 14th-placed team took part in a two-legged play-off against the winners of the 2. divisjon play-offs to decide who would play in the 2021 1. divisjon.

Stjørdals-Blink won 6–1 on aggregate.

Season statistics

Top scorers

Top assists

References

Norwegian First Division seasons
1
Norway
Norway